Mayr-Harting is a surname. Notable people with the surname include:
Henry Mayr-Harting (born 1936), Regius Professor of Ecclesiastical History at the University of Oxford
Robert Mayr-Harting (1874–1948), Austrian-born Czechoslovak politician
Thomas Mayr-Harting (born 1954), English-born Austrian diplomat

See also
Mayr
Harting (disambiguation)

Compound surnames
German-language surnames